"Tweet Dream / Sparkle" is the 4th single by the Japanese girl idol group Fairies,  released in Japan on July 25, 2012 on the label Sonic Groove (a subsidiary of Avex Group).

It is a double-A-side single.

The physical CD single debuted at number 9 in the Oricon weekly singles chart.

Release 
The single was released in several versions: CD+DVD, CD-only,  CD+notebook&shitajiki, and there were also limited-edition picture-labeled CDs that were available only in the Mu-mo online shop.

Track listing

CD+DVD edition

CD-only edition

Limited editions

Charts

Single

"Tweet Dream"

References

External links 
 Discography on the official website of Fairies

2012 singles
Japanese-language songs
Fairies (Japanese group) songs
2012 songs
Avex Group singles
Song articles with missing songwriters